Higher Fruit is the tenth album from Arthur Loves Plastic and was released in 2003.

Awards 
Higher Fruit hola.

Release notes 
"Consider this your soundtrack on the road to transcendance. Features remixes of tracks by pop goddess Linda Smith and folk sensation Verlette Simon, as well as the return of the DIVA, Lisa Moscatiello."

Track listing

Personnel 
Produced by Bev Stanton in the Flamingo Room, Silver Spring, MD.
Mastered by Bill Wolf, Wolf Productions

Additional musicians 
Ryan Fitzgerald - Loops (2) *
CRT - Loops (2) *
Scott Carr - Loops (3) *
Chris Phinney - Loops (3, 5) *
Lisa Moscatiello - Vocals (4, 6, 12)
Dub Jay - Loops (5) *
Captive Audience - Composer (6)
Araden - Loops (7) *
Adam is God - Loops (9) *
Heather Heimbuch - Vocals (11)
Smartbomb - Guitar (11)
Dave Chappell - Guitar (12)

* Remixed for The Tapegerm Collective

Credits 
Sanoma Lee Kellogg - Cover photo

References 

Arthur Loves Plastic albums
2003 albums